Hydnum is a genus of fungi in the family Hydnaceae. They are notable for their unusual spore-bearing structures of teeth rather than gills. The best known are the edible species Hydnum repandum and H. rufescens. There are no known toxic varieties of Hydnum. Widely regarded as important maintainers of forest ecosystems, the Hydnum genus is known to have ectomycorrhizal relationships with multiple plant families. Hydnum has many brittle, white teeth from which the spores drop. Some species have teeth which hang from ascending branches, while other species have teeth which project downwards from the undersurfaces of dead wood. Most Hydnum species are safe to eat, and contain many fatty acids and antioxidants.

Taxonomy and diversity
Hydnum species are found on every continent that is habitable for plant life, with some preferring deep forest regions. Most of the common species, such as H. repandum and H. rufescens can be located in Europe, East Asia, and Australia.

Hydnum repandum is a common and edible species. Also called the "hedgehog mushroom", H. repandum is most often found in Europe, Mexico, and North America. The smooth cap grows as wide as 8 inches across, and the stem is off-center and is less than 2 inches long. H. repandum is often confused in looks for its similar tasting cousin, the Chantrelle mushroom. Medicinally, H. repandum has shown promising signs in preventing malignant sarcomas in mice.

Hydnum rufescens is another common edible variety of hydnum. Known locally as the terracotta hedgehog mushroom, it can be found in Portugal. It has been found to contain high levels of fatty acids and nutrients essential to the human diet.

Hydnum minum is a new species that was described in 2015. First located in Japan, H. minum is identifiable by a "whitish basidiomata", or spore-producing structure.

Hydnum vesterholtii has been newly found in calcium rich areas of the Mediterranean, as well as in the Pyrenees and Italy, and is recognized by a ochre tinted spore cap.

Hydnum ovoideisporum, much like H. vesterholtii, has an orangish colored cap. It is also found in the Iberian-Mediterranian climate and is fond of calcium rich soils.

Species
Hydnum albomagnum
Hydnum crocidens
Hydnum dispersum
Hydnum durieui
Hydnum elatum
Hydnum ellipsosporum
Hydnum investiens
Hydnum magnorufescens
Hydnum minum
Hydnum molluscum
Hydnum oregonense
Hydnum ovoideisporum
Hydnum papyraceum
Hydnum repandum
Hydnum rufescens
Hydnum umbilicatum
Hydnum vesterholtii

References

 
Cantharellales
Agaricomycetes genera